Arzamas is a city in Nizhny Novgorod Oblast, Russia, located on the Tyosha River (a tributary of the Oka),  east of Moscow. Population:

History

Arzamas was founded in 1578 by Ivan the Terrible in the lands populated at the time by Mordvins. By 1737, more than 7,000 people lived in Arzamas and the town became a major transit centre on the route from Moscow to eastern parts of Russia. It was known for its geese and onions as well as leather crafts.

Catherine the Great in 1781 granted town status to Arzamas and a coat of arms based on the colours of the Arzamas regiment. In the early 19th century, Arzamas had over twenty churches and cathedrals, the foremost being the Resurrection Cathedral. It was built in the Empire style to commemorate the Russian victory over Napoleon in 1812.

Alexander Stupin art school was located in Arzamas between 1802 and 1862 and many famous Russian artists studied there, including Vasily Perov.

By the early 20th century it was still an important centre of trade, and had tanneries, oil, flour, tallow, dye, soap and iron works; knitting was an important domestic industry, while sheepskins and sail-cloth were articles of trade. The 1897 population was 10,591.

From 1954 to 1957, Arzamas was the center of Arzamas Oblast, a short-lived administrative unit that was split from Gorky Oblast and later merged back into it.

In 1988, the city was the site of the Arzamas train disaster which caused the death of ninety-one people.

Administrative and municipal status
Within the framework of administrative divisions, Arzamas serves as the administrative center of Arzamassky District, even though it is not a part of it. As an administrative division, it is incorporated separately as the city of oblast significance of Arzamas—an administrative unit with the status equal to that of the districts. As a municipal division, the city of oblast significance of Arzamas is incorporated as Arzamas Urban Okrug.

Population
Ethnic composition (2010):
 Russians – 97.9%
 Ukrainians – 0.4%
 Others – 1.7%

Economy

Local industry includes Arzamas Machine-Building Plant, a manufacturer of military and specialized civilian automotive vehicles (such as BTR-80, GAZ Tigr). It is now part of the GAZ holding company.

International relations

Twin towns and sister cities
Arzamas is twinned with:
 Popovo, Bulgaria
 Ruma, Serbia
 Valozhyn, Belarus
 New Athos, Abkhazia/Georgia
 Alupka, Crimea (Ukraine)
 Vagharshapat, Armenia

Notable people
Patriarch Sergius I of Moscow
Marina Orlova, philologist
Evgeny Namestnikov, ice hockey player
Leonid Nikolaev, conductor
Alexander Stupin, painter

See also
 Arzamas I railway station
 Bayush Razgildeyev
 Sarov (Arzamas-16)

References

Notes

Sources

External links
Official website of Arzamas 
Directory of organizations in Arzamas 
Pictures of Arzamas

Cities and towns in Nizhny Novgorod Oblast
Arzamassky Uyezd
Populated places established in 1578